The women's team event was part of the gymnastics programme at the 1928 Summer Olympics. It was the first Olympic gymnastics event for women, and was the only gymnastics event for women that year. Women's gymnastics would become a permanent event in 1936. Total scores were determined by adding drill, apparatus, and vault components.

Although extensive results detailing the performance of the men gymnasts, both teams and individuals, were published in the Official Olympic Report for these 1928 Summer Olympic Games, only the team results (both combined and with respect to exercise) were published for the women, providing no information whatsoever about the capacities of the various individual women who competed here.

Results
Source: Official results; De Wael

References

Gymnastics at the 1928 Summer Olympics
Olympics Artistic Team
1928 in women's gymnastics
Women's events at the 1928 Summer Olympics